Scott Hamilton may refer to:

Scott Hamilton (figure skater) (born 1958), American figure skater
Scott Hamilton (musician) (born 1954), jazz tenor saxophonist
Scott Hamilton (rugby union) (born 1980), New Zealand rugby union footballer
Scott Hamilton (politician) (born 1958), British Columbia, Canada
Scotty Hamilton (1921–1976), American basketball player and coach